Gobio is a genus of typical gudgeons, ray-finned fish in the family Cyprinidae many of which are endemics of south-eastern Europe. Members of the genus are usually small fish, rarely longer than 10 cm.

Many species previously in Gobio are now placed in the sister genus Romanogobio.

Species
There are currently 46 recognized species in this genus:
 Gobio acutipinnatus Men'shikov, 1939
 Gobio alverniae Kottelat & Persat, 2005 (Auvergne gudgeon) 
 Gobio artvinicus Turan, Japoshvili, Aksu & Bektaş, 2016 
 Gobio balcanicus Dimovski & Grupche, 1977
 Gobio baliki Turan, Kaya, Bayçelebi, Aksu & Bektaş, 2017 
 Gobio brevicirris Fowler, 1976 (Don gudgeon)
 Gobio bulgaricus Drensky, 1926
 Gobio carpathicus Vladykov, 1925 (Carpathian gudgeon)
 Gobio caucasicus Kamensky, 1901 (Colchic gudgeon)
 Gobio coriparoides Nichols, 1925
 Gobio cynocephalus Dybowski, 1869 (Siberian gudgeon)
 Gobio fahrettini Turan, Kaya, Bayçelebi, Aksu & Bektaş, 2018
 Gobio feraeensis Stephanidis, 1973 (Thessaly gudgeon)
 Gobio fushunensis Y. H. Xie, Li & Xie, 2007 (Fushun gudgeon)
 Gobio gobio (Linnaeus, 1758) (Gudgeon)
 Gobio gymnostethus Ladiges, 1960 (Cappadocian gudgeon)
 Gobio hettitorum Ladiges, 1960
 Gobio holurus Fowler, 1976 (Caspian gudgeon)
 Gobio huanghensis P. Q. Luo, Le & Y. Y. Chen, 1977
 Gobio insuyanus Ladiges, 1960 (Cihanbeyli gudgeon)
 Gobio intermedius Battalgil, 1944 (Eber gudgeon)
 Gobio kizilirmakensis Turan, Japoshvili, Aksu & Bektaş, 2016 
 Gobio kovatschevi Chichkoff, 1937 (Varna gudgeon)
 Gobio krymensis Bănărescu & Nalbant, 1973 (Salgir gudgeon)
 Gobio kubanicus Vasil'eva, 2004
 Gobio lepidolaemus Kessler, 1872 (Turkestan gudgeon)
 Gobio lingyuanensis T. Mori, 1934
 Gobio lozanoi Doadrio & Madeira, 2004 (Iberian gudgeon)
 Gobio macrocephalus T. Mori, 1930
 Gobio maeandricus Naseka, Erk'akan & Küçük, 2006 (Işıklı gudgeon)
 Gobio meridionalis T. Q. Xu, 1987
 Gobio microlepidotus Battalgil, 1942 (Beyşehir gudgeon)
 Gobio nigrescens (Keyserling, 1861) 
 Gobio obtusirostris Valenciennes, 1842
 Gobio occitaniae Kottelat & Persat, 2005
 Gobio ohridanus S. L. Karaman, 1924 (Ohrid gudgeon)
 Gobio rivuloides Nichols, 1925
 Gobio sakaryaensis Turan, Ekmekçi, Lusková & Mendel, 2012 (Sakarya gudgeon) 
 Gobio sarmaticus L. S. Berg, 1949 (Ukrainian gudgeon)
 Gobio sibiricus A. M. Nikolskii, 1936
 Gobio skadarensis S. L. Karaman, 1937 (Skadar gudgeon)
 Gobio soldatovi L. S. Berg, 1914 (Soldatov's gudgeon)
 Gobio tauricus Vasil'eva, 2005
 Gobio tchangi S. C. Li, 2015   
 Gobio tungussicus Borisov, 1928
 Gobio volgensis Vasil'eva, Mendel, Vasil'ev, Lusk & Lusková, 2008

References

 
Freshwater fish genera
Taxa named by Georges Cuvier
Taxonomy articles created by Polbot